The 2019 season was Greenville Triumph SC's first of existence. They played in USL League One.

Background 
The formation of a third tier USL League was announced in April 2017, and league officials began touring the country looking for candidate cities for new soccer clubs. USL vice president Steven Short visited Greenville in July 2017, and told local reporters at the time that Greenville was one of the league's top candidates. In early 2018, USL began announcing teams that would play in their inaugural season. The formation of the Greenville Triumph SC was officially announced on March 13, 2018, with local entrepreneur Joe Erwin named as the principal owner. The Greenville team was the third team to join the league after Tormenta FC and FC Tucson, two clubs which already existed and played in USL League Two.

Club

Roster 
As of January 10, 2019.

Team management

Non-competitive

Winter friendlies

Summer friendlies

Competitive

USL League One

Standings

Results by round

Match reports

USL League One Playoffs

U.S. Open Cup

Transfers

In

Statistics

Appearances and goals

|}

Disciplinary record

References

External links 

Greenville Triumph SC seasons
Greenville Triumph SC
Greenville Triumph SC
Greenville Triumph SC